The Way was a professional wrestling stable who performed in WWE on the NXT brand. The group was led by Johnny Gargano and Candice LeRae, and also included Austin Theory, Indi Hartwell, and Hartwell's on-screen husband Dexter Lumis.

History

Background 
On February 16, 2020 at NXT TakeOver: Portland, Gargano turned heel by costing Tommaso Ciampa, his longtime partner and rival, his match against Adam Cole for the NXT Championship, with Gargano justifying his actions by exclaiming that Ciampa had put him through hell for nearly two years and was simply getting his long-overdue revenge. On the April 8 episode of NXT, Gargano and Ciampa faced off in an Empty Arena match, during which LeRae, who for several weeks prior attempted to play peacemaker between the two, also turned heel by assisting Gargano in defeating Ciampa, therefore ending the longtime feud between them.

Following this, Gargano and LeRae began portraying themselves as a power couple, and feuded with another one of NXT's power couples, Keith Lee and Mia Yim. At TakeOver: In Your House, Gargano faced Lee for the NXT North American Championship, but despite LeRae's interference, Gargano was defeated, thanks to Yim fending off LeRae.

Formation 
On October 28 at NXT: Halloween Havoc, Gargano defeated Damian Priest in a Devil’s Playground match to become a two-time NXT North American Champion, and later that same night, LeRae faced Io Shirai for the NXT Women's Championship, during which she was assisted by a masked figure wearing the Ghostface costume, but the figure was fended off by Shotzi Blackheart, ultimately costing LeRae the match. On the November 11 episode of NXT, the masked figure was revealed to be Indi Hartwell, who aligned herself with LeRae. On that same night, Gargano dropped the NXT North American Championship to Leon Ruff thanks to Priest's interference, leading to a three-way feud between them. On December 6 at NXT TakeOver: WarGames, another masked figure dressed as Ghostface interfered in Gargano's Triple Threat match against Ruff and Priest, and assisted Gargano into winning, therefore allowing Gargano to become the first-ever three time NXT North American Champion. After the match, the masked figure revealed himself as Austin Theory.

On the December 9 episode of NXT, Gargano, LeRae, Theory, and Hartwell all appeared together and formally named their alliance as "The Way". Going into 2021, Gargano and Theory teamed up during the 2021 Men's Dusty Rhodes Tag Team Classic, while LeRae and Hartwell paired up during the Women's counterpart. On the January 20 episode of NXT, Gargano and Theory were eliminated in the first round by Kushida and Ruff, although LeRae and Hartwell advanced towards the semi-finals on the February 10 episode of NXT, where they were eliminated by Ember Moon and Shotzi Blackheart.

Success and addition of Lumis 
Gargano's elimination led to a feud between him and Kushida over the championship, and after trading attacks, it was announced that Gargano would defend his championship against Kushida at NXT TakeOver: Vengeance Day on February 14, where Gargano successfully retained his title. Prior to the match, Theory was abducted by Dexter Lumis, whom Theory had been feuding with at the time due to Theory interfering in Lumis' matches against Gargano. On the following episode of NXT, Theory was "found" by Gargano, and Theory seemed relatively okay, albeit extremely positive and cheerful, much to his teammates's confusion and worry. On the February 24 episode of NXT, Gargano faced Lumis in a non-title match, and during the match, LeRae urged Theory attack Lumis with a steel chair, but Theory hesitated, leading to Gargano being ultimately defeated. Also during the match, Hartwell seemed to have gained a level of attraction towards Lumis, and remarked in a post-match backstage segment that Lumis was "hot", shocking Gargano and LeRae.

On the May 4, 2021 episode of NXT, LeRae and Hartwell would defeat Ember Moon and Shotzi Blackheart in a Street Fight to capture the NXT Women's Tag Team Championship, thus marking each woman's first title win in WWE.  On the May 18 episode of NXT, Gargano lost the North American Championship to Bronson Reed in a steel cage match. At The Great American Bash, LeRae and Hartwell lost the titles to Io Shirai and Zoey Stark following a distraction from a returning Tegan Nox.

On the August 3 episode of NXT, Gargano competed in a Love Her or Lose her match with Dexter Lumis for Indi Hartwell. Hartwell came out to ringside before Gargano pinned Lumis. As The Way was walking to the backstage area, Hartwell ran back to the ring and pounced on Lumis despite the stipulation. The storyline would result in a wedding between Hartwell and Lumis being held on the September 14 episode of NXT 2.0. Lumis joined The Way during this process.

Dissolution and aftermath 
Following the wedding, The Way would slowly begin to drift apart. Theory would be drafted to Raw during the 2021 WWE Draft and LeRae went on maternity leave. The Way's final appearance was on December 7 episode of NXT 2.0, in which Gargano, Hartwell and Lumis embraced in a backstage segment. Later that night, Gargano cut a farewell promo, marking his last appearance in NXT as his contract would expire three days later. On April 29, 2022, Lumis was released from his WWE contract.

On the August 22, 2022 episode of Raw, Gargano made his unannounced return to WWE and was interrupted by Theory. After returning to WWE two weeks prior on Raw, Lumis appeared on the August 23 episode of NXT and reunited with Hartwell. Gargano and LeRae would return to the company in weeks ahead.

Sporadic reunions
After weeks of interacting, Lumis, Gargano and LeRae fully reunited The Way minus Hartwell and Theory, at that point who is currently the United States Champion. Lumis and Gargano (with LeRae at ringside), sans The Way label, made its in-ring main roster debut as a team losing to The Judgment Day (Dominik Mysterio and Damian Priest) in a tag team match.

Members

Timeline

Championships and accomplishments 
 Pro Wrestling Illustrated
Ranked Hartwell No. 83 of the top 100 female wrestlers in the PWI Female 100 in 2020
 WWE
 NXT North American Championship (2 times) – Gargano
 NXT Women's Tag Team Championship (1 time) – LeRae and Hartwell
 NXT Year-End Award (1 time)
 Future Star of NXT (2020) – Theory

References

External links
 
 
 
 

WWE NXT teams and stables
WWE teams and stables
Women's wrestling teams and stables